Kapodistrias may refer to:

 Ioannis Kapodistrias, Greek diplomat and Foreign Minister of the Russian Empire and later the first head of state of independent Greece
 Augustinos Kapodistrias, Greek soldier and politician
 Capodistria, the Italian name of the city of Koper, Slovenia
 the 1997 Kapodistrias reform of local government in Greece
 Kapodistrias Museum located in Corfu